Erna cara is the only species in the  monotypic moth genus Erna of the family Erebidae. It is known from Cameroon. Both the genus and the species were first described by Strand in 1915.

References

Hypeninae
Monotypic moth genera